The 1912 Liège–Bastogne–Liège was the seventh edition of the Liège–Bastogne–Liège cycle race and was held on 15 September 1912. The race started and finished in Liège. The race was won by Omer Verschoore.

General classification

References

1912
1912 in Belgian sport